Turbinicarpus pseudopectinatus is a species of plant in the family Cactaceae.

It is endemic to Coahuila, Nuevo León, San Luis Potosí, and Tamaulipas states in northeastern Mexico.  Its natural habitats are temperate forests and hot deserts.

References

Sources

External links
 
 
 

pseudopectinatus
Cacti of Mexico
Endemic flora of Mexico
Flora of Coahuila
Flora of Nuevo León
Flora of San Luis Potosí
Flora of Tamaulipas
Least concern plants
Taxonomy articles created by Polbot